Paul Michael Bator (June 2, 1929 – February 24, 1989) was an American legal academic, Supreme Court advocate and expert on United States federal courts. In addition to teaching for almost 30 years at Harvard Law School and the University of Chicago Law School, Bator served as Deputy Solicitor General of the United States during the Reagan Administration.

Early life and education 
Bator was born in 1929 in Budapest, Hungary, and moved with his parents to the United States in 1939. He attended Groton School and received his A.B., summa cum laude, from Princeton University in 1951, where he was valedictorian.  He earned a master's degree in history from Harvard University in 1953 and graduated summa cum laude from Harvard Law School, where he served as editor of the Harvard Law Review. From 1956 to 1957 he served as law clerk to Justice John M. Harlan II of the United States Supreme Court.

Career

Harvard Law School 
Following a brief period of private practice at Manhattan firm Debevoise, Plimpton & McLean, Bator began teaching at Harvard Law School in 1959. He became a full professor of law in 1962 and from 1971 to 1975 served as associate dean of the law school. While at Harvard, he published many articles, including his famous piece, "Finality in Criminal Law and Federal Habeas Corpus for State Prisoners,"  76 Harv. L. Rev. 441 (1963), which described "how with reason we can arrive at just the reasonable balance between fairness and the need to attain finality in the criminal process." He also co-authored the second (1973) and third (1988) editions of Hart & Wechsler's "The Federal Courts and the Federal System," a leading text on federal jurisdiction.

Deputy Solicitor General 
In 1982 Bator took a leave of absence from Harvard to become Deputy Solicitor General of the United States. He argued and won eight cases on behalf of the government at the Supreme Court, including Hishon v. King & Spalding, which held that Title VII of the Civil Rights Act applies to partnership selection at law firms; Grove City College v. Bell, which applied provisions of Title IX of the Civil Rights Act narrowly; Clark  v. Community for Creative Nonviolence, which denied that protesters' First Amendment rights were violated by a law prohibiting overnight sleeping in Washington, D.C. memorial parks; and Reagan v. Wald, which upheld the validity of currency restrictions imposed on travelers to Cuba.

In 1984, President Ronald Reagan nominated Bator to the United States Court of Appeals for the D.C. Circuit, but he withdrew his name due to illness.

John P. Wilson Professor of Law, University of Chicago 
Bator returned to Harvard after his term as Deputy Solicitor General but in January 1986 he left to join the University of Chicago Law School as the John P. Wilson professor of law. He simultaneously served as associate counsel with the firm Mayer, Brown & Platt, where he practiced appellate law. In his last Supreme Court appearance on October 4, 1988, he successfully represented the United States Sentencing Commission in a case challenging the latter's constitutional validity.

In 1987, Bator testified in support of Judge Robert Bork, whose nomination to the United States Supreme Court was rejected by the Senate. The same year, he was elected a Fellow of the American Academy of Arts and Sciences.

Other 
Bator was a member of the American Law Institute.

End of life and legacy 
Bator died in 1989 and was survived by his wife, Alice Garrett Hoag Bator; sons, Thomas and Michael; and daughter, Julia.

Harvard Law Review tribute 
In June 1989, Harvard Law Review published tributes to Bator by Professor David L. Shapiro, Professor Charles Fried and then-judge Stephen Breyer. Fried characterized Bator's teaching as "Mozartian," displaying "a brilliance, a clarity of intelligence, deployed with lightning speed and a distinctive style that was at once inventive and entirely apt" and described his briefs and arguments before the Supreme Court as "sonatas of reason."

Paul M. Bator Award 
Following Bator's death, the Federalist Society established the Paul M. Bator Award for young law professors. Each year, the prize was awarded to an academic who has demonstrated excellence in legal scholarship, a commitment to teaching, a concern for students, and made a significant public impact.

Past Bator Award recipients

See also 
 List of law clerks of the Supreme Court of the United States (Seat 9)

References

1929 births
1989 deaths
Fellows of the American Academy of Arts and Sciences
Harvard Law School faculty
Law clerks of the Supreme Court of the United States
University of Chicago Law School faculty
Harvard Law School alumni
Lawyers from Cambridge, Massachusetts
Federalist Society members
American scholars of constitutional law
Groton School alumni
Princeton University alumni